St Helens Central (GCR) railway station served the town of St Helens, England with passenger traffic between 1900 and 1952 and goods traffic until 1965.

History
The formal opening was on 2 January with public services beginning the following day, being operated by the Great Central Railway, which was already operating the WJR. The station opened with the commencement of public passenger services on 3 January 1900 and was originally named St Helens.

Overall, the station and goods facilities covered , however the passenger section only consisted of one platform with a somewhat rudimentary wooden canopy shelter (compared to the brick-built booking office). This was in stark contrast to the comprehensive goods sidings, weighbridge, travelling crane and large goods shed. Rail access to this complex was from the north-eastern corner via a double track bridge over Standish Street.  The line then divided into two, the northern branch proceeding into Pilkington's Cowley Hill Plate Glass Works being purely for goods traffic, the other line running to the east. This crossed the LNWR line at Pocket Nook on a single line viaduct. It was originally intended to be double track, but due to difficulties in obtaining sufficient land and clearances plus rising costs, the viaduct was eventually forced to be completed as a single line structure.

Similar financial considerations caused the line to terminate at St. Helens. The original plan was for the line to continue westwards towards Liverpool via proposed stations at Dentons Green, Knowsley and Croxteth Park to a junction with the CLC Lines at Fazakerley, from which point there would be easy access to both Southport and Liverpool.

The station was renamed St Helens Central on 1 March 1949 but closed to passenger traffic three years later on 3 March 1952. It continued to be used for goods until 4 January 1965, when it closed completely. In 1987 this name was given to  station on the Liverpool–Wigan line of the former London and North Western Railway.

Services
In 1922 six "down" (towards St Helens) trains called at the station, on Mondays to Saturdays. These called at all stations from Manchester Central to St Helens via Glazebrook and Culcheth. No trains called on Sundays.

By 1948 four trains plied between St Helens Central and Manchester Central, calling at all stations, Monday to Friday, reduced to three on Saturdays. No trains called on Sundays.

A fuller selection of public and working timetables has now been published. Among other things this suggests that Sunday services ran until 1914, but had ceased by 1922 never to return.

From 1952 until 5 October 1963 some race day specials to Haydock Park had deposited their passengers at the racecourse then travelled to St Helens for servicing, turning and to await their turn to return in the evening. Others appear to have done the same at Ashton-in-Makerfield.

Enthusiasts' railtours travelled the line on 29 September 1956 and 21 September 1963.

Remaining structures
Nothing remains of the station; a wall section of the bridge at Standish Street is still in existence, as is the engine shed - however for many years this has been part of a factory building. Sections of heavily overgrown viaduct abutments and piers further east still remain but as for the immediate station, goods yard, booking office, signal box, turntable and track, these are long since gone, having been replaced by a large car park, Police station, offices and court buildings.

Notes

Sources

External links

Disused railway stations in St Helens, Merseyside
Former Great Central Railway stations
Railway stations in Great Britain opened in 1900
Railway stations in Great Britain closed in 1952